Benapur is a village in Bagnan-II Block, Howrah District, West Bengal. Its location, beside the Rupnarayana River, has made it to an wonderful place for picnic.

The village is divided into North and South Benapur by the Nuntia-Benapur Road, a spur from the Bagnan-Gadiara Road from Nuntia.

Economy
Farming (principally rice paddies and floriculture) forms the mainstay of the village economy, with jaba, golap, aparajita, and ganda flowers cultivated extensively. There are smaller industries producing bricks and, during the rainy season, the prized hilsa fish. Few years back, the village was very famous for producing 'pan', however, farmers are now less interested in it because of low production and other problems relating to environmental pollution mainly caused by brick industry.

Education

Historically Benapur is very rich in education. A school naming Benapur Chandanapara High School (H.S) Benapur Chandanapara High School (H.S)] is very famous in Bagnan. It has long history in producing many talented students who have been established in different fields.

Religion
The village is predominantly Hindu, with local temples to the deities Shitala, Kali, and Shiva. Ma Jagaddhatri and Ma Basanti are worshipped in the village. Vishalakshmi is also an important goddess in this village.

Tour
As the village is just 10 km from NH6, the village is now becoming one of the favorite place for Picnic lovers. Huge area of green riverbank of Rupnarayana river is waiting  with wonderful sites for picnic. Now-a-days a Government Guest House is under construction for welcoming tourist in near future. A huge gathering has been found in every special days for picnic, especially in the months of December–January.

References

Villages in Howrah district